The following is a list of players, both past and current, who appeared at least in one game for the New Taipei Kings (2021–present) franchise.



Players

C

D

G

H

L

M

N

S

T

W

Y

References

P. League+ all-time rosters